The Native Hawaiian Legal Corporation (NHLC) is a non-profit organization dedicated to representing Native Hawaiians in legal disputes over land rights, use of natural resources, sovereignty, and other such issues in Hawaii.

NHLC was founded in 1974, in the midst of the Second Hawaiian Renaissance, as the Hawaiian Coalition of Native Claims.

Its current executive director, as of January 14 2022, is Makalika Naholowaa.

References

External links
NHLC website
 Project Ku'ikahi
 Legal Aid Society of Hawaii

Native Hawaiian
Legal Services Corporation
1974 establishments in Hawaii
Organizations established in 1974
Legal aid in the United States